Musaid Al Aiban is the National Security adviser, Minister of State and member of the Council of Ministers of Saudi Arabia. He serves in both the Saudi Council of Political and Security Affairs (CPSA), and the Council of Economic and Development Affairs (CEDA). He is a graduate of Harvard University in the United States.

References

Musaad
Musaad
Harvard University alumni
Living people
Year of birth missing (living people)